John of Scotland (or John de Scotia or John le Scot), 9th Earl of Huntingdon and 7th Earl of Chester (c. 12076 June 1237), sometimes known as "the Scot", was an Anglo-Scottish magnate, the son of David of Scotland, Earl of Huntingdon by his wife Matilda of Chester, daughter of Hugh de Kevelioc.

John married Elen ferch Llywelyn, daughter of Llywelyn the Great, in about 1222.

John became Earl of Huntingdon in 1219 on the death of his father.

On the death of John's maternal uncle, Ranulph de Blondeville, Earl of Chester, on 26 October 1232, the Earldom of Chester was inherited by John's mother Matilda (Maud) of Chester (Ranulph's eldest sister). Less than a month later with the consent of the King, she gave an inter vivos gift of the earldom to her son John who became Earl of Chester by right of his mother. He was formally invested by King Henry III as Earl of Chester on 21 November 1232. He became Earl of Chester in his own right six weeks later on the death of his mother in January 1233.

John died childless on 6 June 1237, aged 30. He too, like his uncle Ranulph before him, left three sisters as his co-heirs. They agreed to share the estates between them and to make the husband of the eldest sister Christian, William de Forz, Earl of Chester and Huntingdon by right of his wife. However Henry III decided that the earldoms should be annexed to the crown "lest so fair a dominion should be divided among women". In 1246, Henry bought the honour (estate) of Chester from John's four sisters. The earldom of Chester was recreated for Simon de Montfort in 1264, and the earldom of Huntingdon was recreated in 1337 for William de Clinton.

References

John
1207 births
1237 deaths
Earls of Huntingdon (1065 creation)
Earls of Chester